Central Zagori is a former municipality in the Ioannina regional unit, Epirus, Greece. Since the 2011 local government reform it is part of the municipality Zagori, of which it is a municipal unit. The municipal unit has an area of 206.683 km2. Its population was 1,011 in 2011. The seat of the municipality was in Asprangeloi.

References

Populated places in Ioannina (regional unit)
Zagori